Mariana Sofía Speckmaier Fernández (born 26 December 1997) is an American-born Venezuelan professional footballer who plays as a forward for Besta-deild kvenna club Valur and the Venezuela women's national team.

Early life
Speckmaier was born and raised in Florida, living in Miami.

High school and college career
Speckmaier has attended the MAST Academy in Miami, Florida and the Clemson University in Clemson, South Carolina.

Club career
In January 2021, Speckmaier was selected by Washington Spirit in the 2021 NWSL Draft.

On 21 February 2022, Speckmaier signed for Russian club CSKA Moscow on a two-year contract. As three days later began the 2022 Russian invasion of Ukraine, she did not join the Muscovite side and the deal was aborted.

In May 2022, Speckmaier signed with Valur.

International career
Speckmaier represented Venezuela at the 2016 FIFA U-20 Women's World Cup. She made her senior debut on 8 April 2021.

References

1997 births
Living people
People with acquired Venezuelan citizenship
Venezuelan women's footballers
Women's association football forwards
ZFK CSKA Moscow players
Venezuela women's international footballers
Venezuelan expatriate women's footballers
Venezuelan expatriate sportspeople in Russia
Expatriate women's footballers in Russia
Soccer players from Miami
American women's soccer players
Clemson Tigers women's soccer players
Washington Spirit draft picks
Washington Spirit players
National Women's Soccer League players
American expatriate women's soccer players
American expatriate sportspeople in Russia
American sportspeople of Venezuelan descent
Valur (women's football) players
Úrvalsdeild kvenna (football) players